Jordan Academy for Maritime Studies (الأكاديمية الأردنية للدراسات البحرية) is a private educational institution located in Amman, Jordan. It was established in 2002, with 30% of its share being owned by the Arab Bridge Maritime company. The first scholastic year started in fall 2004. The academy offers two-year degrees in Nautical Studies.  It is accredited by the Jordan Maritime Authority.

Programs
 Navigation Officer program 
 Engineering Officer program

References

External links
  Jordan Academy for Maritime Studies website

Educational institutions established in 2002
Universities and colleges in Jordan
Education in Amman
2002 establishments in Jordan